Serhiy Storozhenko is a Ukrainian jurist and football functionary. He is a former first vice-president of the Football Federation of Ukraine and president of the Kharkiv Oblast Football Federation.

External links
 Profile at the Gorodskoi Dozor.
 Birthday congratulations at Metalist Kharkiv website

1949 births
Living people
Yaroslav Mudryi National Law University alumni
Ukrainian jurists
Academic staff of the National University of Kharkiv
Ukrainian football chairmen and investors
FC Metalist Kharkiv
Football Federation of Ukraine officials